Scopula mascula is a moth of the  family Geometridae. It is found in Mozambique.

References

Moths described in 1909
mascula
Moths of Africa